Erythrolamprus sagittifer, the arrow ground snake, is a species of snake in the family Colubridae. The species is found in Argentina, Bolivia, and Paraguay.

References

Erythrolamprus
Reptiles of Argentina
Reptiles of Bolivia
Reptiles of Paraguay
Reptiles described in 1863
Taxa named by Giorgio Jan